Pandora's Hit Box is the second greatest hits album by Swedish Eurodance singer Pandora. The album was only released in Japan. It features tracks from Pandora's studio albums One of a Kind, Tell the World, Changes and This Could Be Heaven. The album was released in March 1998.

The album included the track "Spirit to Win" which was the official track of the 1998 Winter Olympics in Nagano, Japan and a cover of Art Garfunkel's "Bright Eyes", which was released as the first and only single.

Track listing 
 "Don't You Know" (featuring M. Fuse) – 3:49
 "Show Me What You Got" (featuring Patrick Ntumba) – 3:22
 "Smile 'n' Shine"  (UK Remix)  – 3:26
 "A Little Bit" – 3:27
 "Tell the World" (featuring M. Fuse) – 3:39
 "Spirit to Win" – 3:07
 "The Sands of Time" – 3:45
 "If This Isn't Love (What Is It)" – 3:20
 "Bright Eyes" – 4:27
 "Single Life" – 3:39
 "Love And Glory" – 4:02
 "One of Us" – 3:57
 "Smile 'n' Shine"  (Triad Mix)	– 8:59
 "The Sands of Time"   (Espanola Way Mix) – 3:25
 "Tell the World"  (Acoustic Version) – 3:34
 "Mega Mix" – 12:44

Release history

References 

Pandora (singer) albums
1998 compilation albums
Universal Records albums
Compilation albums by Swedish artists